Statistics of Danish War Tournament in the 1943/1944 season.

Series 1

Series 2

Series 3

Quarterfinals
Boldklubben Frem 11-1 Slagelse B&I
Boldklubben 1909 3-1 Kjøbenhavns Boldklub
Aarhus Gymnastikforening 1-2 Boldklubben af 1893
Akademisk Boldklub 1-1 KFUM
Akademisk Boldklub was awarded winner by lot.

Semifinals
Boldklubben af 1893 0-5 Akademisk Boldklub
Boldklubben Frem 5-0 Boldklubben 1909

Final
Boldklubben Frem 4-2 Akademisk Boldklub

References
Denmark - List of final tables (RSSSF)

Top level Danish football league seasons
Den
Football